Stigmella continuella is a moth of the family Nepticulidae. It is found from Fennoscandia to the Pyrenees, Alps and Hungary, and from Ireland to central Russia and Ukraine, east to the eastern part of the Palearctic realm.

The wingspan is 4–5 mm. The head is ferruginous-orange, collar light yellowish. Antennal eyecaps whitish-ochreous. Forewings fuscous-bronze ; a shining silvery fascia beyond middle, preceded by a rather dark purplish-fuscous fascia, apical area beyond this dark fuscous-purple. Hindwings grey. Adults are on wing from May to August.

The larvae feed on Betula nana, Betula pendula and Betula pubescens. They mine the leaves of their host plant. The mine consists of a slender corridor. The first part is strongly contorted. The leaf tissue that is cut off is killed, resulting in a brown spot. Pupation takes place outside of the mine.

References

External links
Fauna Europaea
bladmineerders.nl
UKmoths
Swedish moths
 Stigmella continuella images at  Consortium for the Barcode of Life

Nepticulidae
Moths of Europe
Moths of Asia
Moths described in 1856